Lawrence T. Pennell,  (March 15, 1914 – August 9, 2008) was a Canadian lawyer, politician, and jurist.

Early life, education and military service
Born in Brantford, Ontario, the youngest of six children of English immigrants John and Agnes Pennell, Pennell grew up on a farm near Smithville, Ontario. After graduating from Smithville High School, he worked at Dofasco for two years before attending McMaster University where he majored in political science and economics. After graduating in 1938, he studied law at Osgoode Hall Law School.

He married Anne Andrews, a registered nurse, in 1943.

During World War II, he served in the Royal Canadian Air Force first as an instructor at the British Commonwealth Air Training Plan in Edmonton, Alberta, and then hunting for submarines in the Gulf of St. Lawrence, based in Scotland, and in the west coast of Africa.

After the war, he was called to the Ontario Bar and practiced law in Brantford.

Politics
Pennell was first elected to the House of Commons of Canada as Liberal Member of Parliament for Brant—Haldimand in the 1962 election.

From 1964 to 1965, he was the Parliamentary Secretary to the Minister of Finance.

In 1965, he was appointed to the Cabinet by Prime Minister Lester Pearson as Solicitor General of Canada.

He retired from politics in April 1968 and was appointed to the Supreme Court of Ontario where he served until 1985.

After retiring, he served on the Ontario Mental Health Review Board and on an Ontario commission of inquiry on municipal government.

In 1946, he co-founded the Brantford Red Sox baseball team.

From 1971 to 1977, he was Chancellor of McMaster University.

References

External links
 

1914 births
2008 deaths
20th-century Canadian businesspeople
20th-century jurists
20th-century Canadian lawyers
21st-century Canadian businesspeople

21st-century Canadian lawyers
Baseball executives
Canadian founders
Canadian people of English descent
Canadian King's Counsel
Canadian sports businesspeople
Chancellors of McMaster University
Judges in Ontario
Lawyers in Ontario
Liberal Party of Canada MPs
Members of the House of Commons of Canada from Ontario
McMaster University alumni
Osgoode Hall Law School alumni
People from the Regional Municipality of Niagara
Royal Canadian Air Force personnel of World War II
Solicitors General of Canada
Sportspeople from Brantford